Highway 337 (AR 337, Ark. 337, and Hwy. 337) is a designation for two state highways in the Ozarks. One segment connects Sugar Loaf Mountain Use Area to Highway 92, and the second connects Highway 5/Highway 25 and Highway 16 southeast of Heber Springs. Both routes are maintained by the Arkansas Department of Transportation (ArDOT).

Route description

Van Buren County
Highway 337 begins near the Van Buren/Cleburne county line in the Ozark Mountains. The southern terminus is an intersection with Highway 92, and runs almost due west, but is signed north-south due to Arkansas's signing convention for odd-numbered routes. The highway terminates at the border of the Sugar Loaf Use Area on Greers Ferry Lake, which is owned and maintained by the United States Army Corps of Engineers (USACE, or "the Corps"). The campground has 57 RV/tent sites, two boat ramps, and the Sugar Loaf Mountain Nature Trail.

As of 2016, the route had an annual average daily traffic (AADT) of 280 vehicles per day (VPD), earning a classification as a very low volume local road by the American Association of State Highway and Transportation Officials (AASHTO), meaning fewer than 400 vehicles per day.

Cleburne County
Highway 337 begins at Highway 5/Highway 25 southeast of Heber Springs. It runs southeast to an industrial area before paralleling the Little Red River. The route turns south and intersects Highway 16, where it terminates.

Near the eastern terminus, the AADT was measured as 1,600 VPD in 2016.

Major intersections

History
Highway 337 was first created on June 23, 1965 from Sugar Loaf Mountain to Highway 92. Two months later, the route was swapped with a county road to the current routing. The second route was created on June 28, 1973 from Highway 110 toward an industrial park and Highway 912. This route was extended over the gap between Highway 337 and Highway 912, and replaced Highway 912 to the Highway 16 intersection. Following a realignment project in 1991, Highway 337 was truncated at Highway 5/Highway 25.

See also

 List of state highways in Arkansas

References

 

337
Transportation in Van Buren County, Arkansas
Transportation in Cleburne County, Arkansas